DishHD is a high-definition, direct-to-home satellite television service in Asia. The DishHD corporate headquarters is located in Taipei, Taiwan. The service was launched by EchoStar International in 2010. At first the service was limited to Taiwan, but it was later expanded.

DishHD has over 400 dealers selling the DishHD service. DishHD is also sold in mainland China by some private sellers.

References

External links
 Official site

Direct broadcast satellite services
Television in Taiwan